Robert Watkin Poole (4 November 1874 – December 1933) was an English rugby union and rugby league footballer who played in the 1900s. He played at representative level for England, and at club level for Broughton Rangers.

Playing career

Rugby union
Born in Hartlepool, Poole played rugby union for Hartlepool Old Boys and Hartlepool Rovers. He played at county level for Durham, and also represented England once in 1896.

Rugby league
In 1901, Poole switched codes to rugby league and joined Broughton Rangers.

Poole won a cap for England while at Broughton Rangers in 1905 against Other Nationalities.

References

1874 births
1933 deaths
Broughton Rangers players
England international rugby union players
English rugby union players
England national rugby league team players
English rugby league players
Rugby union players from Hartlepool
Rugby league fullbacks
Rugby league players from County Durham